Condesa por Amor is a 2009 telenovela produced by Venevisión International. It is a remake of the 1997 telenovela Girasoles para Lucía. This new version stars Eileen Abad and Gerónimo Gil as the main protagonists with the antagonistic participation of Bernie Paz and Michelle Vargas.

This telenovela was filmed in the Dominican Republic.

Plot
Ana Paula Treviño dreams of falling in love with Aníbal Paz-Soldán, one of the richest millionaires in the country. One day while walking in the streets, Ana Paula's purse is snatched, and she unfortunately mistakes a witness by-stander, Fernando, to be the thief. Fernando is captivated by Ana Paula's beauty and charm, and he is instantly attracted to her. Fernando later discovers that Ana Paula is poor and must work hard in her father's boarding house in order to try to pay their debts. So, he decides to conquer Ana Paula's heart by omitting that he is a Paz-Soldán, and lying that he is merely an employee at the Paz-Soldán company.

Although Ana Paula and Fernando develop a close friendship, she cannot stop thinking about Aníbal, the man of her dreams. Aníbal is the opposite of Fernando: he is proud and arrogant, looks down upon people below his class, and would not even bother to look at a girl like Ana Paula twice. However, a misunderstanding brings Aníbal and Ana Paula together when he mistakes her for Catalina Lampedusa, an Italian aristocrat known as the Countess of Cogorno.

So, Ana Paula continues to pretend to be a rich countess in order to win Aníbal's heart. However, this is not easy for her, as she has to face Adriana, Aníbal's lover, who will go to any lengths to expose her, and her feelings for her true prince charming, Fernando.

Cast
 Eileen Abad as Ana Paula Treviño
 Gerónimo Gil as Fernando Paz-Soldán
 Bernie Paz as Aníbal Paz-Soldán
 Daniel Delevin as Hugo
 Michelle Vargas as Beatriz Paz-Soldán
 Lourdes Berninzón as Laura Jiménez viuda de Paz Soldán
 Isaura Taveras as Adriana
 Pericles Mejía
 Sonia Alfonso
 Sharlene Taulé
 Ramia Estévez
 Jose Manuel Rodríguez
 Zeny Leyva as Romina Treviño
 Hony Estrella as Josephina
 Nicole Valdéz Abud
 Luis Natera ... Renato
 Mario Hernández
 Hensy Pichardo
 Zdenka Kalina
 Patricia Banks
 Marquis Leguizamon
 Cesar Olmos
 Josué Guerreros
 Conrado Ortiz
 Omar Ramírez
 Mariela González
 Vanessa Cucurrulo
 María Ureña

References

External links
 Condesa por amor at the Internet Movie Database

2009 telenovelas
Venevisión telenovelas
2009 Venezuelan television series debuts
2010 Venezuelan television series endings
Venezuelan telenovelas
Spanish-language telenovelas
Television shows set in the Dominican Republic